The 58th Mobil 1 12 Hours of Sebring presented by Fresh from Florida was the 2010 running of the 12 Hours of Sebring and the opening round of the 2010 American Le Mans Series season.  It took place at the Sebring International Raceway, Sebring, Florida on March 20, 2010.  The race featured the debut of the Le Mans Prototype Challenge category for spec racing.

The duo of LMP1s from Peugeot won the race by a three lap margin over fellow European manufacturer Aston Martin, earning the company their first victory at Sebring.  Winning drivers Marc Gené and Alexander Wurz had previously won the 2009 24 Hours of Le Mans for Peugeot, and were joined by Anthony Davidson for the Sebring win.  The LMP2 category was won by Team Cytosport, the first class victory for the team, while the new LMPC category was led by Level 5 Motorsports who had a 16 lap margin over their nearest competitor.  Risi Competizione Ferrari won their second straight GT2 class at Sebring, while returning American Le Mans team Alex Job Racing won the first participation for the GTC class at the 12 Hours.

Qualifying

Qualifying result
Pole position winners in each class are marked in bold.

Race

Race result
Class winners in bold.  Cars failing to complete 70% of their class winner's distance are marked as Not Classified (NC).

‡ The #95 Level 5 Motorsports entry and the #99 Green Earth Team Gunnar entry were initially disqualified from the results, but, following a rule clarification by the ALMS, the two cars have been reinstated into the results.

References

Sebring
12 Hours of Sebring
12 Hours Of Sebring
12 Hours Of Sebring